Louis Auvray (7 April 1810, in Valenciennes27 April 1890, in Paris) was a French sculptor and art critic. He was the pupil of David d'Angers and was the brother of Félix Auvray, a painter. He continued the Dictionnaire Général des Artistes de l'école française depuis l'origine des arts du dessin jusqu'à nos jours, started by Émile Bellier de La Chavignerie.

Main works
 Portrait d'Alexandre-Charles Sauvageot, 1863, bust, marble, Paris, Louvre
 Portrait du peintre Gentile Bellini, 1871, bust, marble, Paris, Louvre
 Portrait du chroniqueur Jean Froissart, 1843, bust, marble, Versailles
 Portrait du musicien Jean-François Lesueur, bust, marble, Versailles
 Portrait du sculpteur Jacques François Joseph Saly, bust, marble, Versailles
 Portrait du sculpteur Jacques François Joseph Saly, 1838, bust, marble, Valenciennes

References
 Geneviève Bresc-Bautier, Isabelle Leroy-Jay Lemaistre, Musée du Louvre. département des sculptures du Moyen Âge, de la Renaissance et des temps modernes. Sculpture française II. Renaissance et temps modernes. vol. 1 Adam - Gois, Réunion des musées nationaux editions, Paris, 1998
 Simone Hoog, Musée national de Versailles. Les sculptures. I- Le musée, Réunion des musées nationaux, Paris, 1993

External links
 

1810 births
1890 deaths
French art critics
People from Valenciennes
19th-century French journalists
French male journalists
19th-century French sculptors
French male sculptors
French male writers
19th-century French male writers
19th-century French male artists